Kericho Airport is an airport in Kenya.

Location
Kericho Airport  is located in Kericho District, Rift Valley Province, in the town of Kericho, in the southwestern part of Kenya on the map.

The geographic coordinates of this airport are:0° 23' 6.00"S, +35° 14' 42.00"E (Latitude:-0.3850000; Longitude:35.245000).

Overview
Kericho Airport is a small civilian airport, serving the border town of Kericho and surrounding communities.

Airlines and destinations
There is no regular, scheduled airline service to Kericho Airport at this time.

See also
 Kericho
 Kericho District
 Rift Valley Province
 Kenya Airports Authority
 Kenya Civil Aviation Authority
 List of airports in Kenya

References

External links
   Location of Kericho Airport At Google Maps
  Website of Kenya Airports Authority
 List of Airports In Kenya
 

Airports in Kenya
Airports in Rift Valley Province
Kericho County